Attorney General Hughes may refer to:

 Billy Hughes (1862–1952), Attorney-General of Australia
 Francis Wade Hughes (1817–1885), Attorney General of Pennsylvania
 L. C. Hughes (1842–1915), Arizona Territory Attorney General
 Simon Pollard Hughes Jr. (1830–1906), Arkansas Attorney General
 Tom Hughes (Australian politician) (born 1923), Attorney-General of Australia

See also
Hughes (surname)
General Hughes (disambiguation)